The 1988 Tour de France started with 198 cyclists, divided into 22 teams of 9 cyclists. The 22 teams, announced two weeks before the Tour, were:

Teams

Cyclists

By starting number

By team

By nationality
The 198 riders that competed in the 1988 Tour de France represented 20 different countries. Riders from ten countries won stages during the race; Netherlands riders won the largest number of stages.

Notes

References

1988 Tour de France
1988